The Constitutional Liberal Party, most commonly known as Destour, was a Tunisian political party, founded in 1920, which had as its goal to liberate Tunisia from French colonial control.

History 
The term Destour is usually translated as constitutional, and referred to the Tunisian constitution of 1863—the first in the Arab world. It is probably of Persian origin through the presence of Turkish in Northern Africa during the 17th to the 19th century. There is no trace of this word in the Arabic spoken during the pre-Islamic period, nor in the Quran or hadiths, nor in the Arabic language literature during the period preceding the Ottoman Empire, during which this word began to be used in Egypt.

The party wanted to remove all French influence from Tunisia and return to an earlier time. The students, faculty, and alumni of the University of Ez-Zitouna became an integral part of the 1920s Destour party. As time passed, graduates from Sadiki College took the high level positions in the party, while Zitouna graduates were the lower and medium cadres of it.

In 1934, a radical wing of the party, led by Habib Bourguiba, split away and founded the Neo-Destour, which would quickly become the leading force in the Tunisian nationalist movement in the following years.

After Tunisia's independence Destour progressively fell into irrelevance and was eclipsed by Neo-Destour. It continued to publish its newspaper Al Istiklal until 1960 and was eventually disbanded in 1963, when Neo-Destour was declared the only legal party in Tunisia.

Founding members
Ahmed Taoufik El Madani
Ahmed Essafi
Salah Farhat
Ali Kahia
Mohieddine Klibi
Hamouda Mestiri
Ahmed Sakka
Abdelaziz Thâalbi
Habib Zouiten
Hassen Guellaty

See also

Neo Destour
Parti Socialiste Destourian (PSD)
Rassemblement Constitutionel Démocratique (RCD)

Notes

References
 Micaud, Charles A. "Bilingualism in North Africa: Cultural and Sociopolitical Implications." The Western Political Quarterly. March 1974. Volume 27, Issue 1. p. 92–103. Available on Jstor

External links
 History of the beginning of the Destour

Arab nationalism in Tunisia
Arab nationalist political parties
Destourian parties
Political parties established in 1920
Political parties disestablished in 1934
Defunct political parties in Tunisia
Pan-Arabist political parties